The 2021–22 CAF Confederation Cup knockout stage started on 17 April with the quarter-finals and ended on 20 May 2022 with the final to decide the champions of the 2021–22 CAF Confederation Cup. A total of eight teams competed in the knockout stage.

Times are listed in local times.

Round and draw dates
The schedule was as follows.

Format
Each tie in the knockout stage, apart from the final, was played over two legs, with each team playing one leg at home. The team that scored more goals on aggregate over the two legs advanced to the next round. If the aggregate score was level, the away goals rule was applied, i.e. the team that scored more goals away from home over the two legs advanced. If away goals were also equal, then extra time was not played and the winners were decided by a penalty shoot-out. In the final, which was played as a single match, if the score was level at the end of normal time, extra time was played and if the score was still level, the winners were decided by a penalty shoot-out.

The mechanism of the draws for each round was as follows:
In the draw for the quarter-finals, the four group winners were seeded, and the four group runners-up were unseeded. The seeded teams were drawn against the unseeded teams, with the seeded teams hosting the second leg. Teams from the same group could not be drawn against each other, while teams from the same association can be drawn against each other.
In the draws for semi-finals, there were no seedings, and teams from the same group or the same association could be drawn against each other. As the draws for the quarter-finals and semi-finals were held together before the quarter-finals were played, the identity of the quarter-final winners was not known at the time of the semi-final draw.

Qualified teams
The knockout stage involved the 8 teams which qualify as winners and runners-up of each of the eight groups in the group stage.

Bracket
The bracket of the knockout stage was determined as follows:

The bracket was decided after the draw for the knockout stage (quarter-finals and semi-finals), which was held on 5 April 2022, 13:00 GMT (15:00 local time, UTC+2), at the CAF headquarters in Cairo, Egypt.

Quarter-finals
The draw for the quarter-finals was held on 5 April 2022.

Summary
The first legs were played on 17 April, and the second were played on 24 April 2022.

|}

Matches

1–1 on aggregate. Orlando Pirates won 4–3 on penalties.

Al Ahli Tripoli won 1–0 on aggregate.

TP Mazembe won 2–0 on aggregate.

2–2 on aggregate. RS Berkane won on away goals.

Semi-finals
The draw for the semi-finals was held on 5 April 2022 (after the quarter-finals draw).

Summary
The first legs were played on 8 May, and the second legs were played on 15 May 2022.

|}

Matches

Orlando Pirates won 2–1 on aggregate.

RS Berkane won 4–2 on aggregate.

Final

The final was played on 20 May 2022 at Godswill Akpabio International Stadium, Uyo.

Notes

References

External links
CAFonline.com

3
April 2022 sports events in Africa
May 2022 sports events in Africa